Aryeh Azulai (born 9 July 1933) was the third mayor of the city Ashdod in Israel.

Born in Fes, Morocco, Azulai is a teacher by profession. He held a number of roles in the education system until he was elected as mayor of Ashdod in 1983. During his time as mayor his best-known achievement was the foundation of the Ashdod Development Company and the Korin Maman Museum.

He was replaced as mayor by Zvi Zilker (who he had earlier succeeded) in 1989. Since 1993 he has been involved in the Jewish Agency.

References

1933 births
Moroccan emigrants to Israel
20th-century Moroccan Jews
People from Fez, Morocco
People from Ashdod
Israeli schoolteachers
Mayors of places in Israel
Living people
Israeli people of Moroccan-Jewish descent